Necum Teuch (pronounced -comm-taw) is a small rural community on the eastern shore of the  Halifax Regional Municipality  Nova Scotia in the Musquodoboit/Sheet Harbour region of the Marine Drive on Trunk 7. The community is famous for the lifelike scarecrows created by Angela Smith Geddes, author of children's books, including "The Scarecrows of Necum Teuch", "Necum Teuch Notes", "The Shadow People", and several others.

Communications
Postal Code         B0J 2K0
Telephone exchange 902  347

External links
 Scare Crows of Necum Teuch
  Google Map of Necum Teuch

Communities in Halifax, Nova Scotia
General Service Areas in Nova Scotia